The 1920–21 PCHA season was the tenth season of the Pacific Coast Hockey Association. Three teams played 24 games each.  The Vancouver Millionaires won the league championship, but lost the Stanley Cup to the Ottawa Senators of the National Hockey League.

Regular season
The Aristocrats signed Frank Fredrickson who had starred in the Olympics. He scored for Victoria in his first game. Mickey MacKay returned to play after a year's layoff with a broken jaw. Bernie Morris returned to regular-season play after missing the previous season due to his arrest in the United States for alleged draft dodging. Morris spent nearly a year at Alcatraz before he was freed.

On March 4, a special "Moose Johnson Night" was held to honour Moose Johnson who had played ten years in the league. Presentations to Johnson were made before the game. The game itself went to sixty minutes of overtime before the teams agreed to leave the score a draw.

Cyclone Taylor scored the final goals of his career in the final game on March 11. He scored a hat-trick in an 8–11 loss to Victoria.

Final standings
GP = Games Played, W = Wins, L = Losses, T = Ties, Pts = Points, GF = Goals For, GA = Goals against

Teams that qualified for the playoffs are highlighted in bold

Source: Coleman(1966)

Playoffs

PCHA Championship
Vancouver defeated Seattle in a two-game total-goal series 7–0, 6–2 (13–2) to win the league championship and advance to the Stanley Cup series.

Source:

Stanley Cup Championship

The Stanley Cup finals took place in Vancouver, British Columbia between the Millionaires and Ottawa Senators of the National Hockey League, alternating between PCHA and NHL rules. Ottawa won the series 3–2. The attendance per game during the series averaged 10,000 people which was a record for its time. It was an extremely hard fought and close series as all games were decided by only one goal.

Schedule and results

Source: Coleman(1966).

Player statistics

Scoring leaders

Goaltending averages
''GP = Games played; GA = Goals allowed; SO=Shutouts; GAA=Goals against average

Source: Coleman(1966)

See also
List of Stanley Cup champions
1920 in sports
1921 in sports

References

Notes

Bibliography

External links
Hockey Database

 
Pacific Coast Hockey Association seasons
2
PCHA